Xun is the Mandarin pinyin romanization of the Chinese surname written  in Chinese character. It is romanized Hsün in Wade–Giles. Xun is the 201st surname in the Song dynasty classic text Hundred Family Surnames. It is not among the top 300 most common Chinese surnames.

Notable people
 Xun Xi (荀息; died 651 BC), minister of Duke Wu of Jin, enfeoffed at Xun
 Xun Kuang or Master Xun (ca. 312–230 BC), ancient Confucian philosopher
 Xun Shuang (128–190), Eastern Han dynasty politician and historian
 Xun Chen ( 2nd century), Eastern Han dynasty advisor to warlord Han Fu
 Xun You (157–214), Eastern Han dynasty statesman and adviser to warlord Cao Cao
 Xun Yu (163–212), Eastern Han dynasty statesman and adviser to warlord Cao Cao
 Xun Yi (died 274), Jin dynasty politician
 Xun Can ( 209–237), Three Kingdoms-era scholar and philosopher
 Xun Xu (died 289), Western Jin dynasty politician, artist and musician
 Xun Song (荀崧; 263–329), Jin dynasty official and governor, descendant of Xun Yu
 Xun Guan (born 303), Jin dynasty military commander, daughter of Xun Song
 Lady Xun (died 335), mother of Emperor Ming of Jin
 Xun Huisheng (1900–1968), Peking opera singer

References

Chinese-language surnames

Individual Chinese surnames